Gottfried Wilhelm Sacer (11 July 1635 – 8 September 1699) was a German jurist, poet, satirist and Protestant hymn writer. He worked as an advocate at the court of Wolfenbüttel. Johann Sebastian Bach used a stanza from his hymn "" to conclude his Ascension Oratorio. Another hymn, Jesu, meines Glaubens Zier, appears in the 1736 Schemelli Gesangbuch in a setting attributed to Bach.

Career 

Sacer was born in Naumburg, the son of the town's mayor. He was first educated by private teachers and from 1649 at the Landesschule Pforta. From 1654 he studied at the University of Jena law and literature. In 1657 he accepted a position as Hofmeister in Berlin where he had contact to poets such as Paul Gerhardt, Georg Philipp Harsdörffer and Andreas Tscherning. Johann Rist made him a member of the literary association Elbschwanenorden under the name Hierophilo.

From 1669 he worked as an advocate at the court of Wolfenbüttel, a post for which he had to complete his studies. He achieved the doctorate in September 1671 in Kiel. His last post was Fürstlicher Kammerkonsulent (Ducal chamber counselor). He died in Wolfenbüttel and is buried in the Marienkirche, Wolfenbüttel.

Work 
Among Sacer's publications are:
 . Stettin 1661
 Reime dich, oder ich fresse dich. Northausen (recte: Jena) 1673 (Digitalisat)
 (translation) Pierre Antoine Mascaron: . Leipzig 1666

Sacer's satirical writings, namely Reime dich, oder ich fresse dich, criticism of the work of his colleagues in poetry, are still read and often quoted.

"" 

Later versions appear under the title "", for example the "" (Protestant hymnal for church usage) of 1836, sometimes with six stanzas. Johann Sebastian Bach used the hymn's seventh stanza, "", to conclude his Ascension Oratorio. Among Bach's hymn writers, Sacer was the only contemporary.

Literature 
     
 Wolfgang Kelsch: . In: Braunschweigisches Jahrbuch. 60, 1979, pp. 85–97.
 Leopold Pfeil: ". Northausen 1673. Winter, Heidelberg 1914 (Diss. Heidelberg 1914).
 Gerhard Dünnhaupt: "Gottfried Wilhelm Sacer (1635–1699)", in: Personalbibliographien zu den Drucken des Barock, vol. 5. Stuttgart: Hiersemann 1991, pp. 3517–26.

References

External links 
 
 
 Lo, God to Heaven Ascendeth! christmysong.com
 Gott fähret auf gen Himmel christliche-gedichte.de
 Oratorium auf Himelfahrt s-line.de
 Gottfried Wilhelm Sacer deutsche-digitale-bibliothek.de
 Reim dich oder ich fress dich! (in German) translation possibilities for Sacer's famous title, dict.leo.org

German poets
1635 births
1699 deaths
People from Naumburg (Saale)
University of Jena alumni
Jurists from Saxony-Anhalt
University of Kiel alumni